Olle Nåbo (born 12 April 1956) is a Swedish orienteering competitor. He received a silver medal in the relay event at the 1978 World Orienteering Championships in Kongsberg, together with Rolf Pettersson, Lars Lönnkvist and Kjell Lauri, and placed fifth in the individual event.

References

1956 births
Living people
Swedish orienteers
Male orienteers
Foot orienteers
World Orienteering Championships medalists